Ledeč nad Sázavou (until 1921 Ledeč) is a town in the Havlíčkův Brod District in the Vysočina Region of the Czech Republic. It has about 4,800 inhabitants. The historic town centre is well preserved and is protected by law as an urban monument zone.

Administrative parts
Villages and hamlets of Habrek, Horní Ledeč, Obrvaň and Souboř are administrative parts of Ledeč nad Sázavou.

Geography
The southern part of the municipal territory with the town proper lies in the Křemešník Highlands, the northern part extends into the Upper Sázava Hills. The Sázava River flows through the town.

History
The first written mention of Ledeč comes from the 12th century, when it was written about "a noble of Ledeč". In the first half of 16th century, during the rule of the Ledecký of Říčany noble family, Ledeč was promoted to a town.

In the early 19th century, the railway was built, which helped the economical and cultural development of the area.

Until 1918, the town was a part of the Austrian monarchy (Austria side after the compromise of 1867), in the district of the same name, in Bohemia. In 1921, Ledeč was renamed Ledeč nad Sázavou.

Demographics

Sights
The main sight is the Ledeč nad Sázavou Castle. The castle was built in the early Gothic style in the first half of the 13th century, and later was rebuilt in Renaissance and Baroque styles. It has a unique sgraffito decoration of the ceiling of the renaissance hall. The castle now contains a museum and a gallery.

Notable people
Zdeněk Bárta (1891–1987), fencer
František Laudát (born 1960), politician

References

External links

Populated places in Havlíčkův Brod District
Cities and towns in the Czech Republic